Brian Jones (born July 2, 1980) is a former American football quarterback who played three seasons in the Arena Football League with the Las Vegas Gladiators, Arizona Rattlers and Kansas City Command. He played college football at the University of Toledo, after a record setting career at Shasta College. He also played in the af2 for the Memphis Xplorers and Manchester Wolves, winning ArenaCup VI with the Xplorers.

College career

College career statistics

Professional career

Memphis Xplorers
Jones played for the Memphis Xplorers of the af2 from 2004 to 2006. In nine games with the Xplorers in 2004, Jones passed for 1,578 yards, completing 134 of 226 attempts and rushing 99 yards on 44 attempts. He threw 22 touchdown passes and rushed for 12 more. In 2005, he set the franchise's single-season marks with 69 passing touchdowns and 23 rushing touchdowns. He also recorded a league-leading passer rating of 123.11, completed 245 of his 388 attempts for 3,384 yards, 69 touchdowns and 7 interceptions. On the ground, Jones was the team's leading rusher with 229 yards. The Xplorers won ArenaCup VI against the Louisville Fire.

Las Vegas Gladiators
Jones signed with the Las Vegas Gladiators on October 10, 2005. He was released by the Gladiators on January 20, 2006.

Memphis Xplorers
Jones played for the Memphis Xplorers in 2006, recording 3,937 yards passing and 81 touchdown passes for new single-season records.

Las Vegas Gladiators
Jones signed with the Las Vegas Gladiators on December 13, 2006. He recorded 25 passing touchdowns on 1,834 yards in 2007 for the Gladiators.

Columbus Destroyers
Jones was awarded to the Columbus Destroyers on October 29, 2007. He was released by the Destroyers on February 24, 2008.

New Orleans VooDoo
Jones was signed to the New Orleans VooDoo's practice squad on March 7, 2008. He was released by the VooDoo on March 10, 2008.

Arizona Rattlers
Jones signed with the on Arizona Rattlers March 13, 2008. He was released by the Rattlers on April 4, 2008.

Manchester Wolves
Jones came out of retirement in 2008 to play for the Manchester Wolves during the af2 playoffs. He again came out of retirement to play for the Wolves during the 2009 af2 playoffs.

Kansas City Command
Jones played for the Kansas City Command in 2012, recording ten touchdowns on 529 passing yards.

References

External links
Just Sports Stats
Toledo Rockets stats

Living people
1980 births
American football quarterbacks
Shasta Knights football players
Toledo Rockets football players
Memphis Xplorers players
Las Vegas Gladiators players
Columbus Destroyers players
New Orleans VooDoo players
Arizona Rattlers players
Manchester Wolves players
Arkansas Diamonds players
Kansas City Command players
Sportspeople from Chico, California
Players of American football from California